The Roman Catholic Diocese of Bjelovar-Križevci is a diocese in the Ecclesiastical province of Zagreb in Croatia. On December 5, 2009 Pope Benedict XVI erected the Diocese of Bjelovar-Križevci with territory taken from the Archdiocese of Zagreb. On the same day the Pope erected the new Diocese of Sisak, also in Croatia and within the Ecclesiastical province of Zagreb.

The see of the diocese is in the city of Bjelovar, where the Cathedral of Saint Teresa of Avila is situated. The diocesan co-cathedral of the Holy Cross is in the city of Križevci.

Leadership
 Bishops of Bjelovar-Križevci (Roman rite)
 Bishop Vjekoslav Huzjak (since 2009.12.05)

See also
Roman Catholicism in Croatia

Sources
 Catholic Information
 Italian Wikipedia
 GCatholic.org
 From the Vatican Press Office

Roman Catholic dioceses in Croatia
Roman Catholic dioceses and prelatures established in the 21st century
Diocese